Ixora is a genus of flowering plants in the family Rubiaceae. It is the only genus in the tribe Ixoreae. It consists of tropical evergreen trees and shrubs and holds around 544 species. Though native to the tropical and subtropical areas throughout the world, its centre of diversity is in Tropical Asia. Ixora also grows commonly in subtropical climates in the United States, such as Florida where it is commonly known as West Indian jasmine. Other common names include viruchi, kiskaara, kepale, rangan, kheme, ponna, chann tanea, techi, pan, siantan, jarum-jarum/jejarum, jungle flame, jungle geranium, and cruz de Malta, among others. 
The plants possess leathery leaves, ranging from 3 to 6 inches in length, and produce large clusters of tiny flowers in the summer. Members of Ixora prefer acidic soil, and are suitable choices for bonsai. It is also a popular choice for hedges in parts of South East Asia. In tropical climates, they flower year round and are commonly used in Hindu worship, as well as in ayurveda and Indian folk medicine.

In Brazil, fungal species Pseudocercospora ixoricola was found to be causing leaf spots on Ixora coccinea. Then in 2018, in Taiwan, during a fungal study, it was found that plant pathogens of Pseudopestalotiopsis ixorae and Pseudopestalotiopsis taiwanensis caused leaf spots on species of Ixora, which is a popular garden plant in Taiwan.

Selected species 

Ixora albersii 
Ixora backeri 
Ixora beckleri 
Ixora brevipedunculata 
Ixora calycina 
Ixora chinensis 
Ixora coccinea 
Ixora elongata 
Ixora euosmia  
Ixora finlaysoniana 
Ixora foliosa 
Ixora johnsonii 
Ixora jucunda 
Ixora killipii 
Ixora lawsonii 
Ixora malabarica 
Ixora margaretae 
Ixora marquesensis 
Ixora mooreensis 
Ixora nigerica 
Ixora nigricans 
Ixora ooumuensis 
Ixora panurensis 
Ixora pavetta 
Ixora peruviana 
Ixora pudica 
Ixora raiateensis 
Ixora raivavaensis 
Ixora rufa 
Ixora saulierei 
Ixora setchellii 
Ixora st-johnii 
Ixora stokesii 
Ixora temehaniensis 
Ixora ulei 
Ixora umbellata 
Ixora yavitensis

Gallery

References 
Vietnamese name of Ixora is cây trang thái

 
Rubiaceae genera
Taxa named by Carl Linnaeus
Plants that can bloom all year round